The Community and People of Waiheke Island (CAPOW) was an incorporated society started 2003 representing much of the community of Waiheke Island, New Zealand during the dispute over the proposed redevelopment of the Matiatia ferry wharf site. The group fought against a District Plan change giving permission given to a large retail development at the ferry terminal, and eventually won, with the Environment Court ruling that Auckland City Council had erred in allowing a development of such size to be given the go-ahead.

With this win, the incorporated society members voted to put the organisation into "vigilant mode" with a caretaker board of directors and an operational web site, capow.org.nz . The society maintains an active member list, so it may be activated without legal paperwork matters, should the need arise.

References

External links 
 https://web.archive.org/web/20190517002007/http://www.waihekepedia.org/index.php/CAPOW

Environmental organisations based in New Zealand
Waiheke Island
2003 establishments in New Zealand
Organisations based in Auckland